Bormotova is a rural locality (a village) in Leninskoye Rural Settlement, Kudymkarsky District, Perm Krai, Russia. The population was 79 as of 2010. There are 4 streets.

Geography 
Bormotova is located 35 km southwest of Kudymkar (the district's administrative centre) by road. Kosogor is the nearest rural locality.

References 

Rural localities in Kudymkarsky District